Māris Martinsons (born July 25, 1960) is a Latvian film director, producer, screenwriter and film editor. From 1991 he has lived and worked in Lithuania, but moved back to his homeland Latvia in 2010.

Biography
After graduating from the Latvia Conservatoires in 1989 as a drama theatre director, Martinsons worked with Latvian musicians as an independent director/producer of music video clips. His first music video clip, "This is My Car" by the band Jumprava, was the first independent video in Latvia’s history and it received the best video award from [reference] in 1989/1990. Since 1991, Māris has lived in Lithuania, where together with a partner he founded the production company “ARTeta” (1994). ARTeta has become a leading production company and the biggest studio complex (300, 600 and 900 sq meters big pavilions) in the Baltic States.

In Lithuania, Martinsons worked in the TV field, producing over ten original TV series, and creating TV series and videos, where he often served as both the director and author of these productions. Since 2005 he has participated in various workshops in Europe developing skills in script writing, developing and marketing.

In 2006 Martinsons finally wrote a script for the arthouse movie Loss. The script was written in Jaipur, and preparation for the shooting was managed from Bangkok. The film was shot in Lithuania and Ireland, edited just when his third son was born and finished during his visit in Beijing. In January, 2008, the film was released in Lithuania. In June, 2008 film was selected for the Official Competition of the 11th Shanghai International Film Festival and it was awarded with 2 prizes: Best Director and Best Music. Later this year Loss was submitted as the nominee from Lithuania for Best Foreign Language Film consideration for the 2009 Academy Awards (Oscars).

In 2009-2010 Māris Martinsons coordinated the development of a second feature film Amaya, also known as Hong Kong Confidential. This film stars brilliant Japanese actress Kaori Momoi and Lithuanian musician/actor Andrius Mamontovas. It was notable as the first-ever Latvian-Hong Kong co-production in the film industry. Amaya has received a mixture of acclaim and criticism since its debut screening in Riga, Latvia on 14 September 2010. It was a Best Foreign Language Film nominee from Latvia submitted to the 2011 Academy Awards (Oscars).

This must be a first in Academy Awards (Oscars) history, having the first two movies by the same director/producer nominated by different countries!

On 12 June 2011, the gala Hong Kong premiere of Amaya at the Harbour Road Arts Centre was attended by dignitaries including the Prime Minister of Latvia, Valdis Dombrovskis, the Latvian Ambassador to China, distinguished Professors Roger King and Maris Martinsons (no relation), and many members of the Latvian community in Hong Kong.

In January, 2013 the third film by Māris Martinsons Christmas.Uncensored (original title Tyli naktis) has been released in Lithuania. It's a controversial drama, black comedy with a budget of only USD 45 000. The National premiere was held right after Māris Martinsons finished to shoot a psychological mystery drama Oki - in the middle of the ocean in Los Angeles, USA. It has been re-union with Japanese actress Kaori Momoi. The film premiere was on 2014. After the release of drama based on legendary Shakespear's novel - Romeo n'Julietin 2015, passionately worked on the feature film - drama / mystery Magic Kimono starring Kaori Momoi and Issey Ogata. It's been the first co-production ever between Latvia and Japan.

Filmography
Magic Kimono" (2017) as director, writer, editorRomeo n'Juliet" (2015) as director, co-producer, editor
Oki - in the middle of the ocean (2014) as director, co-producer, writer, editor 
Christmas.Uncensored (2013) as director, co-producer, writer, editor
Amaya also known as Hong Kong Confidential (2010) as director, co-producer, editor, writer
Loss (2008) as director, co-producer, editor, co-writer

Television filmography
42 (TV miniseries, 2007) as director, producer, co-writer
Anastasia (TV movie, 2006) as director, producer, co-writer
Anastasia (TV series, 2005) as director, producer, co-writer 
Refresh(TV series, 2004) as author, co-director
Tenants (TV series, 2004) as author, director
Julia (TV series, 2002–2003)as author, co-writer, director, producer
De Facto (TV series, 2002–2003) as author, director
Shapro show (TV humor show, 2001–2003) as author, director
Valse of destiny (TV series, 2001–2002) as author, co-writer, co-director, producer
Grybauskai (TV series, 2000–2001) as co-director
Ben’s diary (TV series, 1999–2000) as author, director, producer

Awards
Shanghai Film Festival (China)
Won: Jin Jue (Golden Goblet) award for Best Director (for Loss)

References

1960 births
Living people
Film people from Riga
Latvian film directors
Lielais Kristaps Award winners